Flight 830 may refer to

World Airways Flight 830, crashed on 19 September 1960
Olympic Airways Flight 830, crashed on 23 November 1976
Pan Am Flight 830, exploded on 11 August 1982,
Air Malta Flight 830, hijacked on 9 June 1997

0830